Wavefront Technology Solutions Inc.  is a provider of secondary oil recovery and environmental technologies. The company was founded in 1997 as PE-TECH by CEO Brett Davidson and University of Alberta professor Tim Spanos. The company was later changed to Wavefront Technologies and Environmental Services.  Wavefront Technology Solutions Inc. and is known for its patented technology that sends pulses through the ground to simulate the effects of the aftershock of an earthquake to aid in the recovery of stranded oil. These technologies simulate the beating of a heart  when a heart pumps, it sends pulses through the body's blood vessels, causing the network of capillaries to expand and contract. When a pulse is applied to the ground, it expands and contracts the porous rock, essentially freeing the trapped oil. This technology is used for fluid flow optimization having applications in both the environmental and energy sectors. In the environmental sector, the process is marketed as Primawave, while in the energy sector it is marketed as Powerwave.

Powerwave technology has been put to use in more than 175 well applications throughout North America, including applications in California, Oklahoma, and Alberta. Powerwave has already been used in the field by EnCana, Penn West Energy Trust, Pengrowth Energy Trust, BP, Chevron , and Apache Corporation, among others.

Wavefront Technology Solutions Inc. is headquartered in Edmonton, Alberta, Canada , and has offices in Calgary, Alberta , and Cambridge, Ontario. The company also has offices in Houston, and Raleigh, North Carolina.

History 

Wavefront Technology Solutions Inc. was founded in 1997 under the name PE-TECH Inc. (Pulse Enhancement Technology Inc.).  PE-TECH, a privately held company holding intellectual property operated three subsidiaries; Prism Production Technologies Inc., Wavefront Environmental Technologies Inc., and E2 Solutions Inc. (US subsidiary standing for "Energy and Environmental").  In 2000 the shareholders of the privately held PE-TECH Inc. entered into an agreement with a publicly listed company (or in this case a shell of a company) on the TSX Venture Exchange.

A reverse takeover of that entity transformed PE-TECH Inc., from a privately held company to a publicly traded company under the name Wavefront Energy and Environmental Services Inc.  For consistency in name branding, Prism Production Technologies was renamed Wavefront Reservoir Technologies Inc., Wavefront Environmental Technologies was rolled into Wavefront Reservoir Technologies Inc. and E2 Solutions Inc. was renamed Wavefront Energy and Environmental Services USA Inc. Effective March 27, 2009, the company's name was changed to "Wavefront Technology Solutions Inc."

Rationale 

Brett Davidson and University of Alberta professor Tim Spanos teamed up in 1997 to fulfill a need that they believed to exist in the onshore oil drilling industry. While working on oil well stimulation site in Alberta, Canada, Davidson heard from a friend in the industry that there was a need for fast, effective, and inexpensive stimulation treatment for oil wells.

After using the most sophisticated oil recovery techniques, oil companies only retrieve a fraction of the crude oil at their sites. The oil well will become too uneconomical to continue pumping because most of the remaining oil is stuck in the
nooks and crannies between the rock and sand.

Even after all the work is done, around 60% of the  oil is left in the ground. With more than 200,000 fields in North America alone, extracting even as little as 10% more oil would translate to billions of more barrels of oil recovered.

Primary Oil Recovery Stage 

During primary recovery, the reservoir's natural pressure or gravity drives oil into the wellbore, combined with artificial lift techniques (such as pumps) which bring the oil to the surface. But only about 10 percent of a reservoir's original oil in place is typically produced during primary recovery.

But petroleum isn't the only thing trapped in the earth. Water hides there too. Sooner or later, the reservoir begins producing water, along with oil, and it becomes uneconomical to continue. The oil companies will then re-inject the water back into the reservoir. This stage of production is called secondary recovery.

Secondary Oil Recovery Stage 

Water injection helps maintain down hole pressure so that oil can continue to flow. Water from the injection well is also used to sweep or push them towards the producing wells. But rock in the reservoir has varying permeability; the more permeable the rock is, the more easily the fluid can flow through.

Unfortunately, water flows more readily than oil, and it always takes the path of least resistance. Once water creates a channel through the permeable rock to the producing well bore, there is little benefit in injecting additional water. It only bypasses the oil instead of sweeping it ahead. The result is poor recovery from the reservoir.

Products and Technologies 
Wavefront Technology Solutions's patented technology was created to combat the "path of least resistance". In this way, the Powerwave and the Primawave share the same scientific principles. This technology, originally penned as "Power Pulse Technology", uses pulses to improve the liquid flow in the ground for improved oil recovery (IOR) in the energy sector and groundwater remediation in the environmental sector. These identical processes generate a fluid pulse that momentarily expands the pore structure of rock and soil. The liquid is then able to flow freely and more uniformly.

Early iterations of Wavefront Technology Solutions's Power Pulse Technology have penned the "Premier Pulse Tool". Premier Pulse Tool, or PPT for short, was a  steel mandrel with a valve system on top and inverted swab cups on the bottom.

Using a standard well servicing rig, the PPT would be lowered to a location above the good perforations. The tool would then be rad up eight meters and dropped. This was done between 200 and 550 times over eight to 12 hours.

This workover and field stimulation technique used steady, non-seismic pulse vibrations to knock out perforation blockage and create a tsunami-like wave effect that encouraged flow in the reservoir.

This technology, utilized in both the Powerwave and Primawave, generates a fluid pressure pulse that causes a momentary elastic flexure of the pore structure. This pressure pulse moves the fluid in and out of a larger number of pore networks, obtaining a more uniform injection front.

Powerwave 

In the energy sector, Wavefront Technology Solutions Inc. has patented the Power Pulse Technology as "Powerwave." This process has been field-tested and proven to increase the amount of oil recovered from on shore oil wells, including low-producing or even abandoned fields.
Powerwave utilizes this technology to improve the flow of water through geological materials, including sedimentary soils and fractured rock. These materials are composed of a solid matrix and pore structure, which contain fluids such as gas and oil.

The Powerwave tool generates a fluid displacement wave in the porous media akin to ripples from a stone thrown in a pond. These ripples generate high liquid accelerations in the pores facing liquids out or treatment fluids in.

In the ten-plus years that the technology behind Powerwave has been developed by Wavefront Technologies and Environmental Services, it has evolved from a product that cost nearly $1 to make and had to be transported using two tractor-trailerss to one that can be shipped via courier. The Powerwave tool now is only one meter high and eight centimetres in diameter. Wavefront Technology Solutions Inc. leases the product to oil companies and charges around $3,000 a month for a minimum 12-month period.

Powerwave's ability to improve uniformity in oil wells has translated to higher production rates, extending the life of a field, and enhancing its value. In Texas, one recent field trial raised production rates from eight wells by 26%. A similar project in Alberta, Canada initially raised output by 18%.

Primawave 

In the environmental sector, Wavefront Technology Solutions Inc. has patented the Power Pulse Technology as "Primawave." Primawave is used largely in the United States. It is licensed to service providers to use the process in conjunction with established methods to treat and eliminate hazardous chemicals from contaminated groundwater.

NASA once used Primawave to clean up soil that had been contaminated with tetrachloroethylene (dry-cleaning fluid). In the 1960s NASA used hazardous chemicals to remove the soot generated by rockets from the launch site.

Years after using the chemical, the area was saturated with carcinogens. NASA knew that a mixture including iron fillings would decontaminate the soil. NASA then used the Primawave to get the fillings into the ground.

See also

 Enhanced Oil Recovery
 Water injection (oil production)
 Flood
 Oil reserves
 Reservoir simulation
 Peak Oil
 United States oil politics
 Petroleum politics
 Energy security
 Oil sands
 Stripper well
 Workover
 WellInterventionn

Referencesorganisations majorcompanies Amer

Companies traded over-the-counter in the United States
Companies listed on the TSX Venture Exchange
Petroleum in Canada
Technology companies established in 1997
Technology companies of Canada
Companies based in Edmonton